Aviasud Engineering was  a French aviation company that specialized in composite lightweight aircraft.

From 1980, it produced:

The 1983 Aviasud Sirocco (Cruise speed: 80 km/h, Empty weight: 131 kg); single-seat parasol monoplane.
The 1985 Aviasud Mistral AE 206 (Cruise speed: 72 kt | 83 mph | 133 km/h, Empty weight: 215 kg | 474 lb); biplane (also a twin version).
The 1991 Aviasud Albatros AE 209 (Cruise speed: 67 kt | 78 mph | 125 km/h, Empty weight: 230 kg | 507 lb); two-seat ultralight. Three versions with different engines.

Address (1986):  Aviasud Engineering, z.i.la palud-83600, Frejus, France; tel: 94 53 94 00, tx 461172 F aviasud

Aerospace companies of France
Defunct manufacturing companies of France